Prithika Pavade (born 2 August 2004) is a French table tennis player of Indian descent. She competed in the 2020 Summer Olympics.

Biography 
She discovered table tennis under the influence of her father, who was born, like her mother, in Pondicherry and who played for a long time at a good level in India. The family moved to Le Bourget, near the Paul-Simon gymnasium, where she played for the Bourget table tennis club. She started playing this sport when she was in the first grade. This left-handed player quickly became known for her speed and intelligence.

References

External links
 

2004 births
Living people
Sportspeople from Saint-Denis, Seine-Saint-Denis
Table tennis players at the 2020 Summer Olympics
French female table tennis players
Olympic table tennis players of France

French people of Indian descent
21st-century French women